Metalopha is a genus of moths of the family Noctuidae.

Selected species
Metalopha gloriosa (Staudinger, 1892)
Metalopha liturata (Christoph, 1887)

References
Natural History Museum Lepidoptera genus database

Cuculliinae